Werner Olk (born 18 January 1938) is a German former professional football player and manager.

Club career 
Olk started his football career as a youth player with SG Letter 05 (Hanover region) in 1948 and eventually switched into the youth team of TuS Seelze. Before his transfer to Bayern Munich, he played 1956–57 in the Oberliga Nord with Arminia Hannover and after the relegation of the club from 1957 to 1960 in the second tier, which in this part of Northern Germany was the Amateuroberliga Niedersachsen.

He spent his career in the 1960s through to 1970 with German club Bayern Munich in the Oberliga Süd and the Bundesliga. His honors with Bayern include the DFB-Pokal in 1966, 1967 and 1969; winner of the German Championship in 1969; and winner of the European Cup Winners' Cup in 1967. After the promotion to the Bundesliga in 1965 until 1970, Olk served as Bayern's captain, a function in which he was succeeded by Franz Beckenbauer.

International career 
Olk won his only cap for the West Germany national team in 1961. He was an available member of the German squad at the 1962 FIFA World Cup in Chile. In the amateur squad of the Germany national team, Olk was called up three times. He was also called up into the youth national team in 1961 for a match against England.

Coaching career 
After his time with Bayern, Olk became player-manager with Swiss second division side FC Aarau. He stayed there until 1973, although he had been relieved of his manager duties by December 1972, and was replaced in this role by Jiří "Georges" Sobotka. Afterwards, Olk became a manager for German clubs such as Eintracht Braunschweig, SV Darmstadt 98 (with which he achieved promotion to the Bundesliga in 1981), SC Freiburg, SC Preußen Münster, and Karlsruher SC (with which he achieved promotion to the Bundesliga in 1984). He also had a brief engagement managing St. Gallen in the Swiss League during the 1985–86 season.

From 1990 to 1992, Olk coached the Morocco national team, with which he qualified for the African Nations Cup in January 1992 and the Olympic Games later in the same year in Barcelona. Morocco remained in both competitions without win. From 1995 to 1997, he was in charge of El Zamalek of Cairo, Egypt, with which he won the African Cup of Champions Clubs of 1996, where they prevailed in the finals over Nigeria's Shooting Stars SC.

Olk also had two spells as assistant coach at Bayern Munich. From 1975 to 1977, he was assisting Dettmar Cramer in a period when the club the European Champions' and Intercontinental Cups of 1977. Between 1986 and 1988, he served under Udo Lattek and Jupp Heynckes, being part of the team that won the German championship of 1987.

Career statistics

References

External links
 
 
 
 

1938 births
Living people
People from Ostróda
Sportspeople from Warmian-Masurian Voivodeship
People from East Prussia
Association football defenders
German footballers
Germany international footballers
SV Arminia Hannover players
FC Bayern Munich footballers
FC Aarau players
FC Bayern Munich non-playing staff
German football managers
German expatriate football managers
German expatriate sportspeople in Morocco
Expatriate football managers in Morocco
West German expatriate sportspeople in Switzerland
Expatriate football managers in Switzerland
Expatriate footballers in Switzerland
Bundesliga players
FC Aarau managers
FC Augsburg managers
Eintracht Braunschweig managers
SC Freiburg managers
Karlsruher SC managers
FC St. Gallen managers
Morocco national football team managers
Zamalek SC managers
SC Preußen Münster managers
SV Darmstadt 98 managers
CS Sfaxien managers
1992 African Cup of Nations managers
Expatriate football managers in Egypt
German expatriate sportspeople in Egypt
Footballers from Hanover
West German footballers
West German expatriate football managers
West German expatriate footballers
West German football managers